Hypsognathus (from  , 'height' and  , 'jaw') is an extinct genus of procolophonid parareptile from the Late Triassic of New Jersey, Connecticut, and Nova Scotia.

Because of its broad teeth, Hypsognathus is thought to have been a herbivore. Its body is low and broad and it has a relatively short tail. Hypsognathus has some spikes on the side of its head, probably for protection against predators.

References

Triassic parareptiles
Leptopleuronines
Late Triassic reptiles of North America
Taxa named by Charles W. Gilmore
Fossil taxa described in 1928
Prehistoric reptile genera